Sollia may refer to:

Places
Sollia, a village in Stor-Elvdal municipality in Innlandet county, Norway
Sollia (municipality), a former municipality in Hedmark county, Norway
Sollia Church, a church in Stor-Elvdal municipality in Innlandet county, Norway
Sollia, Akershus, a village in Vestby municipality in Viken county, Norway
Sollia (Fjordruta), a hiking lodge in the Vinje area of Heim municipality in Trøndelag county, Norway
Sollia (Gurskøya), a mountain on the island of Gurskøya in Møre og Romsdal county, Norway